Casimir Oberfeld (16 November 1903 – January 1945), also spelled Kazimierz Oberfeld, was a Polish-born French composer. He worked on many film scores and also wrote popular songs of the 1920s and 1930s. Following France's invasion by Germany in 1940 during the Second World War, as a Jew Oberfeld faced increasing persecution. Having taken shelter in Italian-occupied Nice he was arrested when the area was taken over by the Germans. He was sent to Auschwitz where he was murdered in January 1945.

Career
The music of the patriotic song of Nazi-collaborationist Vichy France "Maréchal, nous voilà !", while credited to André Montagnard and Charles Courtioux, was in fact plagiarised from a work by Oberfeld called "."

Selected filmography
 The Sweetness of Loving (1930)
 The Man in Evening Clothes (1931)
 The Triangle of Fire (1932)
 Antoinette (1932)
 The Regiment's Champion (1932)
 The Blaireau Case (1932)
 The Porter from Maxim's (1933)
 The Uncle from Peking (1934)
 Rigolboche (1936)
 A Legionnaire (1936)
 You Can't Fool Antoinette (1936)
 Excursion Train (1936)
 Street of Shadows (1937)
 Heartbeat (1938)
 Barnabé (1938)
 Tricoche and Cacolet (1938)
 The Porter from Maxim's (1939)
 The Five Cents of Lavarede (1939)
 Monsieur Hector (1940)

References

Bibliography
 Mould, Michael. The Routledge Dictionary of Cultural References in Modern French. Taylor & Francis, 2011.

External links

 Scores by Casimir Oberfeld in digital library Polona

1903 births
1945 deaths
People from Łowicz
People from Warsaw Governorate
Polish Jews who died in the Holocaust
Polish emigrants to France
Polish composers
Polish people who died in Auschwitz concentration camp
World War II refugees